The Park Crematorium is the crematorium for the town of Aldershot in Hampshire  and surrounding districts, including North East Hampshire and parts of Surrey and Berkshire. It was designed by Frank Taylor, the Aldershot Borough Surveyor, and opened in July 1960. Today it is operated and maintained by Rushmoor Borough Council.

Facilities

Located near Aldershot Park and between Aldershot Cricket Club and the Lido, in addition to the crematorium the facility also has 16 acres of grounds in the Gardens of Remembrance which was formerly Kiln Copse, a woodland at the edge of Aldershot Park. Here ashes can be interred. The hall holds about 80 people in addition to an organ. The complex was renovated in 1996–1997 and includes a memorial room containing Books of Remembrance.

The Park Crematorium is able to live stream funerals around the world.

Sir John Betjeman
After the Poet Laureate  John Betjeman attended a service there he wrote the poem 'Aldershot Crematorium':

Notable cremations

 Pauline Baynes, illustrator, author and commercial artist who was the first illustrator of some of J. R. R. Tolkien's minor works and of C. S. Lewis's Chronicles of Narnia.
 Comedian Arthur English was cremated here and his ashes buried in the crematorium gardens with those of his first wife.
 Aldershot-born Norman "Dinky" Diamond, drummer in the 1970s with the band Sparks was cremated here.
 Elaine Batt, mother of songwriter and musician Mike Batt, who designed the costumes for his The Wombles band.
 Air Vice-Marshal Frederick "Freddie" Hurrell, Director-General of the RAF Medical Services from 1986 to 1988.

See also

 Aldershot Military Cemetery
 Aldershot Cemetery, the town's civil cemetery

References

External links
 

Buildings and structures in Aldershot
Cemeteries in Hampshire
Crematoria in England
1960 establishments in England